Trevor Johnson (born in Salford, Lancashire) is a Manchester-based graphic designer. He started his career as a commercial illustrator and went on to become a freelance graphic designer, designing record sleeves and branding for Factory Records and Hacienda Nightclub Fac 51 which was instrumental in the creation of the Madchester music scene of the late 1980s and early 1990s. His designs created as Trevor Johnson and with his partner business Johnson/Panas for Factory Records are documented in the Factory Records Catalogue of sleeves and merchandise and company promotional material.

Publications
Factory Records The Complete Graphic Album FAC 461 - M, Robertson - Thames & Hudson (2006) -  
The Art of The Club Flyer - N, Ackland Snow / N, Brett / S, Williams - Thames & Hudson (1996) (Reprinted 2001) - 
Sublime - Manchester Music and Design 1976-1992 - A, Spinoza/B, Bytheway/D, Crow - Cornerhouse Publications (September 1992) - 
The Hacienda Must Be Built - J, Savage - International Music Publications (1992) -

References

English graphic designers
People from Salford
Living people
Madchester
Year of birth missing (living people)